Bombella favorum is a Gram-negative, aerobic and pellicle-forming bacterium from the genus of Bombella which has been isolated from a honeycomb of Western honey bees.

References 

Rhodospirillales
Bacteria described in 2021